WOHC (90.1 FM) is a Christian Worship formatted radio station licensed to Chillicothe, Ohio, United States and broadcasts the nationally syndicated Air 1 feed.  The station is currently owned by EMF Broadcasting.

References

External links

Air1 radio stations
Radio stations established in 1992
1992 establishments in Ohio
Educational Media Foundation radio stations
Ohio